Get Even is the debut album by British boy band Brother Beyond, released on the EMI/Parlophone label in two different editions, both in 1988, generally referred to as Get Even I and Get Even II. The second edition of the album included two songs by Stock Aitken Waterman, "The Harder I Try" and "He Ain't No Competition", which replaced two songs written by the band.

Background
The album's songs were composed between 1986, when Brother Beyond's first single "I Should Have Lied"—the only single by the band not to make the UK Top 75—was issued, and 1988. The two Stock Aitken Waterman tracks, "The Harder I Try" and "He Ain't No Competition", were added to the album after EMI won the production team's services at a charity auction and became the band's only UK Top 10 hits.

Like many British bands at the time (such as Patsy Kensit's Eighth Wonder during their earlier period), Brother Beyond enjoyed more success in continental Europe than at home, especially in Italy where their second single "How Many Times" (which only made it to Number 62 in the UK) was a big hit in 1987. In their native Great Britain it would take until the summer of the following year and the release of the Mike Stock, Matt Aitken and Pete Waterman produced track "The Harder I Try" for the band to score a hit. The song reached number 2 in the UK Singles Chart. "The Harder I Try" samples the drum intro from The Isley Brothers' "This Old Heart of Mine"; its successor "He Ain't No Competition" reached number 6 in November 1988. The 12" version of the song had already topped the Hi-NRG charts in October.

Brother Beyond's final significant hits were two remixed versions of self-penned Get Even II album tracks "Be My Twin", which got to number 14 in January 1989, and "Can You Keep a Secret?", which got to number 22 in April (the first version of the song had been released as the band's fourth single, reaching number 56 in 1987). The latter would be the last significantly successful single for the group in the UK ("Drive On", the first single from their second and final studio album Trust would only reach number 39 and the title-track "Trust" number 53).

Get Even also spawned a 57-minute live concert video, entitled Brother Beyond – The Get Even Tour – Live 1989, issued on the VHS format in 1991, the same year of release as the band's final single, "The Girl I Used to Know", which found little success in the UK (number 48), but was a minor hit in the United States. The group broke up shortly after its release.

Track listing

Personnel

Get Even I

Line up
Nathan Moore – lead vocals
David White – guitar
Carl Fysh – keyboards
Eg White – drums / percussion

Musicians
Steve Alexander – drums, percussion
Belva Haney, Dee Lewis, Eric Robinson, Flakey C, Frankie Madrid, Leroy Osbourne, Mae McKenna, Vicki St. James, Tessa Niles – background vocals
Eg White – bass guitar, keyboards
Dave Mattacks, Steve Ferrone – drums
Peter-John Vettese, Richard Cottle, Rob Fisher, Ian Curnow, Steve Pigott – keyboards
Luís Jardim – percussion
Martin Ditcham – drums, percussion
Bimbo Acock, Phil Todd – saxophone

Production
Same as Get Even II, plus:
Brother Beyond – production (tracks 5, 9)
Michael H. Brauer per MHB Productions – remix and additional production
Mike Pela per Power Plant London – sound engineer
Carl Beatty – sound engineer (track 9)
Rafe McKenna – remix and additional production (track 9)

Recording studios
Abbey Road Studios
Advision Studios
Battery Studios
The Chocolate Factory
Eden Studios
Mayfair Studios
The Music Works
Power Plant Studios
PWL Studios
Rockfield Studios
Swanyard Studios
Trident II Studios

Staff
Three Associates – design
Sheila Rock – photography
Simon Carter for Management One – management

Get Even II

Line up
Nathan Moore – lead vocals
David White – guitar
Carl Fysh – keyboards
Steve Alexander – drums / percussion

Musicians
Eg White – drums, percussion
Belva Haney, Dee Lewis, Eric Robinson, Flakey C, Frankie Madrid, Leroy Osbourne, Mae McKenna, Vicki St James – background vocals
Dave Mattacks, Steve Ferrone – drums
Peter Vetesse, Richard Cottle, Rob Fisher – keyboards
Ian Curnow – keyboards
Steve Pigott – keyboards
Luis Jardim – percussion
Martin Ditcham – drums, percussion
Bimbo Acock, Phil Todd – saxophone

Production
Stock Aitken Waterman – production (tracks 1, 7)
Brother Beyond – production (tracks 6, 11, 12)
Richard James Burgess – production (track 3)
Don Was – production (tracks 4, 8)
Michael H. Brauer – production (track 5); remix (tracks 8, 9)
Mike Pela – production (track 8); sound engineer (tracks 4, 8, 11)
Stephen Hague – remix (track 4)
Ian Curnow – production (track 2); programming
Steve Pigott – programming
Chris Blair – mastering @ Abbey Road Studios
Mike Duffy – sound engineer (track 2)
Phil Harding – sound engineer, mix, production (track 2)
Frank Roszak – sound engineer (track 3)
Phil Brown – additional sound engineer (track 4)
Phil Legg – sound engineer (tracks 5, 9, 10)
Mike Ging – additional sound engineer (track 5)
Mark Stent – sound engineer (track 6)
Rafe McKenna – sound engineer, mix (track 12)
Karen Hewitt – sound engineer (track 1)
Yoyo – sound engineer (track 1)
Mark McGuire – sound engineer (track 7)
Pete Hammond – mix (tracks 1, 7)

Recording studios
Same as Get Even I, plus:
Olympic Studios (II)
The Manor (II)

Staff
The Artful Dodgers Ltd – design
Cindy Palmano – front cover photography
Simon Fowler – other photography
Simon Carter for Management One – management

Charts

Weekly charts

Certifications

Release details

Get Even I

Get Even II

References

External links
Discogs: cover art, product details, track listing and credits to Get Even II, with direct links to updated biographies, detailed discographies and recent photos of all related performers participating in the album.
EveryHit.com: UK Top 40 Hit Database.
Nathan Moore Official: Nathan Moore's Official Website, including a detailed history and discography of Brother Beyond.
Paul Gambaccini, Tim Rice, Jonathan Rice (1993), British Hit Singles, Guinness Publishing Ltd.

1988 debut albums
Brother Beyond albums
Albums produced by Stock Aitken Waterman
Albums produced by Don Was